A cigar is a roll of tobacco.

Cigar or the Cigar can also stand for:

As an acronym
 CIGAR (aviation), a mnemonic for pre-takeoff checklists (Controls, Instruments, Gas, Attitude, Run-Up)
 CIGAR string, a representation of sequence alignment in Bioinformatics (Compact Idiosyncratic Gapped Alignment Report)
 CII GUI Architecture

People
 Delbert Daisey (1928–2017), American waterfowl wood carver and decoy maker known as "Cigar" Daisey
 Marvin Elkind (aka "the Weasel" or "the Cigar"), Jimmy Hoffa's driver and subject of The Weasel: A Double Life in the Mob, a 2011 biography
 Carmine Galante (1910–1979), American mobster also known as "Cigar"
 Paul McKinney (1925–2013), American poker player

Race horses
 Cigar (horse) (1990–2014), an American Thoroughbred racehorse
 Cigar, a steeplechase horse that flourished around 1841

Other uses
Cigar (band), an American punk rock band
 Cigar Lake, Saskatchewan, Canada - see Cigar Lake Mine

See also
 Cuphea ignea, a species of flowering plant also known as the cigar plant or cigar flower
 Lasioderma serricorne or cigar beetle, a species
 Olindias phosphorica or cigar jellyfish, a species
 Cookiecutter shark or Cigar shark, a species of dogfish shark
 Cigar wrasse, a species of marine fish
 Beroe (ctenophore) or cigar comb jellies, members of a genus of comb jellies
 Messier 82, also known as the Cigar Galaxy
 Cigar Bowl, a post-season American college football bowl game from 1947 to 1954
 Cigar Mile Handicap, American Throughbred horse race named after the 20th century horse
 Nick Popaditch (born 1967), American retired Marine Corps gunnery sergeant and political candidate known as the "Cigar Marine"
 Sigar

Lists of people by nickname